West Linn High School is a public high school in West Linn, Oregon, United States. It is one of two high schools in the West Linn-Wilsonville School District, the other being Wilsonville High School.

Academics
In 1984, West Linn High School was honored in the Blue Ribbon Schools Program, the highest honor a school can receive in the United States.

In 2008, 93% of the school's seniors received their high school diploma. Of 373 students, 346 graduated, 18 dropped out, 6 received a modified diploma, and 3 are still in high school.

In 2014, 95% of the school's seniors graduated. 16 students dropped out.

The school received a silver ranking from U.S. News & World Report's 2010 "America's Best High Schools" survey.

The four-year graduation rate at West Linn High School was 97 percent for the Class of 2013 cohort, meaning that nearly all West Linn students who entered high school in September 2009 graduated on time.

Athletics
West Linn High School has enjoyed a high level of athletic success in previous years. The school has recently won state championships in boys basketball 4 times, football 2 times, baseball, girls golf, and boys lacrosse twice in a row.

The school's athletic programs include football, cross country, soccer, volleyball, basketball, wrestling, baseball, softball, swimming, lacrosse and track and field, competing at the highest level (6A), in the Three Rivers League

OSAA State Championship Teams (Classification)
 Baseball (3) - 1978, 1982, 2022 (AAA)
 Boys Basketball (5) - 1997 (4A), 2013, 2014, 2015, 2016 (6A)
 Football (2) - 2016, 2022 (6A)
 Girls Golf (3) - 2010, 2011, 2014, 2016 (6A)
 Boys Swimming (1) - 1948
 Girls Swimming (2) - 1950, 1951
 Boys Tennis (2) - 2003, 2004 (4A)
 Boys Track & Field (3) - 1996, 1997, 1998 (4A)
 Volleyball (4) - 1998, 1999, 2003 (4A), 2007 (6A)
 Dance Team (2) - 1989, 1991 (Large Show)
 Choir (2) - 2019, 2022 (6A)

OSAA Individual State Champions (Classification)
 Boys Golf - Peter Nichenko, 1992 (4A); Daniel Griffiths (TIE), 2000 (4A)
 Girls Golf - Sharon Shin, 2009 (6A); Morgan Thompson, 2011 (6A)
 Boys Tennis - Rian Rifkin / Austin Rifkin (doubles), 2003 & 2004 (4A); Stephen Robertson (singles), 2004 (4A)
 Boys Track & Field - Nate Dicenzo (100m), 1996 (4A); Evan Kelty (200m) 1996-97-98, (400m) 1998 (4A); Josh Haskett (300m Hurdles) 1997 (4A); Davis / Kelty / Sean / Dicenzo (4x100) 1996 (4A); Gross / Voboril, Van Meter / Kelty (4x400) 1997 (4A); Dan Acker (High Jump) 1961 (4A); Mike Ehlers (High Jump) 1984, (Long Jump) 1984 (4A); Casey Kauffman (Javelin) 2003 (4A); Rob Mamula (Shot Put) 2000 (4A); Amis / Radtke / Oilar / Tressler (One Mile Relay) 1982 (4A); Roman Ollar (1500m) 2016 (6A)
 Girls Track & Field - Katrina deBoer (800m) 1993 (4A); Elizabeth Rogers (800m) 1997 (4A); Nicole Woodward (3000m) 1989 (4A); Catherine Johnston (300m Hurdles) 1990 (4A); Lightowler / Johnston / Humrich / Veenker (4x400) 1989 (4A); Fisher / Numrich / St. John / Johnston (4x400), 1990 (4A); Hackbarth / Brown / Baker / Rogers (4x400) 1997 (4A); Kim Carroll (High Jump) 1978 (4A); Ali Super (Javelin) 2006 (4A), 2007–08 (6A)
 Boys Wrestling - Bob Kenney (168 lbs) 1960 (4A); John Eudaly (136 lbs) 1964 (4A); Arnie Bagley (275 lbs) 1979 (4A); Lance Johnson (123 lbs) 1988 (4A); Shane Johnson (178 lbs) 1991 (4A); Joe Donnerberg (275 lbs) 1993 (4A); Landon Poppleton (130 lbs) 1994 (4A); Joel Harris (103 lbs) 2001 (4A); Matt Kim (119 lbs) 2004 (4A);  Prescott Garner (119 lbs) 2007 (6A); Mitch Gaulke (285 lbs) 2009 (6A); Tim Harman (145 lbs) 2014 (6A) Sean Harman (152 lbs) 2017 ("6A") Cael Brunson (145 lbs) 2019

Oregon High School Lacrosse Association Championships
 Boys Lacrosse (3) - 2003, 2014, 2015

Oregon Girls Lacrosse Association Championships
 Girls Lacrosse (4) - 2002*, 2003*, 2013, 2015  (*as West Linn/Wilsonville)

Notable alumni
 Dan Browne - distance runner, former U.S. Olympic athlete
 Kate Davis – singer, bassist
 Brandon Ebel - president of Tooth & Nail Records
 Cole Gillespie - former professional baseball player
 Tony Glausi - musician
 David Hume Kennerly - Pulitzer Prize winning photographer
 Haley Joelle - songwriter and singer
 Anthony Mathis - professional basketball player
 Cade McNown - former professional football player
 Elijah Molden - professional football player
 Payton Pritchard - professional basketball player, Boston Celtics
 Chael Sonnen - silver medalist in Greco Roman Wrestling World University Championships, professional MMA fighter
 Hollis Taylor - zoomusicologist
 Mitch Williams - former professional baseball player

References

External links
West Linn High School website

West Linn, Oregon
High schools in Clackamas County, Oregon
Public high schools in Oregon